The 1967 New Hampshire Wildcats football team was an American football team that represented the University of New Hampshire as a member of the Yankee Conference during the 1967 NCAA College Division football season. In its second year under head coach Joe Yukica, the team compiled a 5–3 record (2–3 against conference opponents) and finished fourth out of six teams in the Yankee Conference.

Schedule

References

New Hampshire
New Hampshire Wildcats football seasons
New Hampshire Wildcats football